Jakub Rolinc (born 12 May 1992) is a professional Czech football player who is currently playing for Prostějov.

References

External links
 
 

1992 births
Living people
Czech footballers
Czech Republic youth international footballers
Czech Republic under-21 international footballers
Association football forwards
Czech First League players
Slovak Super Liga players
Czech National Football League players
II liga players
SK Sigma Olomouc players
1. SC Znojmo players
FC Baník Ostrava players
1. FC Tatran Prešov players
1. SK Prostějov players
Expatriate footballers in Slovakia
Czech expatriate sportspeople in Slovakia
Expatriate footballers in Poland
Czech expatriate sportspeople in Poland